Lysmata ankeri is a species of saltwater shrimp first classified as Lysmata wurdemanni. It is found in shallow waters of the Atlantic Ocean, and can be distinguished by its coloration pattern.

References

Further reading
Wirtz, Peter, Gustavo de Melo, and Sammy de Grave. "Symbioses of decapod crustaceans along the coast of Espírito Santo, Brazil." Marine Biodiversity Records 2 (2009): e162.
Baeza, J. Antonio, et al. "Molecular phylogeny of shrimps from the genus Lysmata (Caridea: Hippolytidae): the evolutionary origins of protandric simultaneous hermaphroditism and social monogamy." Biological Journal of the Linnean Society 96.2 (2009): 415-424.
Zhang, Dong, et al. "Surface glycoproteins are not the contact pheromones in the Lysmata shrimp." Marine biology 157.1 (2010): 171-176.
Baeza, J. Antonio. "Molecular systematics of peppermint and cleaner shrimps: phylogeny and taxonomy of the genera Lysmata and Exhippolysmata (Crustacea: Caridea: Hippolytidae)." Zoological Journal of the Linnean Society160.2 (2010): 254-265.

Alpheoidea
Crustaceans described in 2006